Good behaviour (or ... behavior, or compounds incorporating them) may refer to:
 Good behavior or good conduct time, penal system and legal terminology
 Good Behavior Game, educational psychology research and practice

Good behaviour may also refer to:

Literature
 Good Behaviour (Keane novel), a 1981 by Molly Keane
 Good Behavior, a 1985 novel in John Dortmunder series by Donald E. Westlake
 Good Behavior, a 2016 compilation in The Letty Dobesh Chronicles series by Blake Crouch

Television
 Goode Behavior, a 1990s sitcom which aired on UPN
 Good Behavior, a 2008 ABC TV pilot based on the New Zealand series Outrageous Fortune
 Good Behavior (TV series), a 2016 drama airing on TNT

See also
 Behavior (disambiguation)
 Good (disambiguation)
 Pathological (mathematics)
 Bad Behaviour (disambiguation)